Chris Flynn (born November 17, 1966) is a former Canadian football quarterback and is the only player to win the Hec Crighton Trophy three times as the most valuable player in Canadian university football. He was a 3-time All Canadian with the Saint Mary's Huskies (Bachelor of Arts degree) and played for SMU from 1987-1990. He played for the Montreal Machine of the World League of American Football in 1991 and 1992, played and coached in France from 1993-96, and played for the CFL's Ottawa Rough Riders in 1996. He was inducted into the Saint Mary's Hall of Fame in 2001, inducted into the Canadian Football Hall of Fame in 2011, and inducted into the Nova Scotia Sport Hall of Fame in 2015. He was voted in a Sportsnet poll as the #1 university football player of the past 50 years. In 2019 Chris Flynn's #1 jersey was the first jersey retired in the 217 year history of Saint Mary's University. In 2021 TSN's Gridiron Nation show voted Chris as the all-time Great Canadian Goat in Canadian University football history. In 1994 Flynn received a Medal of Honor for Courage and Bravery for saving a young woman from drowning in the Seine river in France.

References

Living people
Players of Canadian football from Quebec
Canadian football quarterbacks
Saint Mary's Huskies football players
Ottawa Rough Riders players
Montreal Machine players
Canadian Football Hall of Fame inductees
1966 births
Anglophone Quebec people
Sportspeople from Gatineau
Gridiron football people from Quebec
Canadian expatriate sportspeople in France